Sphegina bridwelli is a species of hoverfly in the family Syrphidae.

Distribution
Canada, United States.

References

Eristalinae
Insects described in 1924
Diptera of North America